Dr. Wolf Hess (1945 - 2022) was a German philatelist who signed the Roll of Distinguished Philatelists in 2010.   He was a Fellow of the Royal Philatelic Society London (RPSL); his exhibit "Finland Postal History" won the Grand Prix in Sofia in 2009. Dr. Hess was a retired vascular and trauma surgeon by profession and resided in Ratingen, Germany.

References

German philatelists
Signatories to the Roll of Distinguished Philatelists
Living people
1945 births